Sampson Creek is a stream in Daviess, Gentry and Harrison counties of the U.S. state of Missouri. It is a tributary of the Grand River.

The stream flows generally to the south passing under US Route 136 on the east side of New Hampton. The stream turns to the south-southwest and passes through a portion of eastern Gentry County before turning to the southeast and re-entering and passing through the southwest corner of Harrison County and into northwest Daviess County. The stream turns to the south and enters the Grand River 1.5 miles southwest of Pattonsburg.

Sampson Creek has the name of Benjamin Sampson, a pioneer citizen.

See also
List of rivers of Missouri

References

Rivers of Daviess County, Missouri
Rivers of Gentry County, Missouri
Rivers of Harrison County, Missouri
Rivers of Missouri